Wadala Bridge is a monorail station on Line 1 of the Mumbai Monorail located at Wadala Village in the Wadala suburb of Mumbai, India. Lies on the Rafi Ahmed Kidwai Road which is nearby Vadala Road railway station.

Wadala Bridge Monorail station connects with  railway station with the length of 150m far. there is a demand for renaming Wadala Bridge monorail station into Nana Fadnavis Bridge Monorail station for becoming relatable.

References

Mumbai Monorail stations
Railway stations in India opened in 2019